{{DISPLAYTITLE:C14H21NO2S}}
The molecular formula C14H21NO2S (molar mass: 267.39 g/mol) may refer to:

 2C-T-17, or 2,5-dimethoxy-4-(β-secbutylthio)phenethylamine
 2C-T-8

Molecular formulas